Trenton is an unincorporated community and census-designated place (CDP) in Henry County, Iowa, United States.

Trenton was first listed as a CDP prior to the 2020 census.

Demographics

History
Trenton's population was 80 in 1925.

References 

Census-designated places in Henry County, Iowa
Census-designated places in Iowa